Josep Andreu i Lasserre (April 23, 1896 – July 26, 1983), best known as Charlie Rivel, was an internationally known Catalan circus clown. He was born in Cubelles (Barcelona, Spain). His parents Pere Andreu Pausas (Catalan) and Marie-Louise Lasarre (French), were circus artists as well.

He debuted at the age of three and formed the group Los Rivels with his brothers Polo Rivel and René Rivel. He took his artistic first name from Charlie Chaplin whom he encountered first in 1910. Each respected the other. Legend has it that Chaplin later asked him: "Is it you who imitate me or I who imitate you?"

He later discovered his definitive routine, featuring a chair, a guitar and a long jersey.

In 1970, he appeared in Federico Fellini's film I clowns.

He performed in the interval act for the Eurovision Song Contest 1973 in Luxembourg.

The Charlie Rivel Hall in Cubelles is a museum dedicated to him,

There is also a park dedicated to him in Vigo in the province of Pontevedra, Spain.

Representation in popular culture 

1896 births
1983 deaths
Male film actors from Catalonia
Clowns from Catalonia
Spanish clowns